Nam Yoon-ho (born January 19, 1984) is a South Korean male curler.

At the national level, he is a four-time Korean men's champion.

Teams

References

External links

Video: 

Living people
1984 births
Sportspeople from Gangwon Province, South Korea
South Korean male curlers
Pacific-Asian curling champions
South Korean curling champions
Asian Games medalists in curling
Curlers at the 2017 Asian Winter Games
Medalists at the 2017 Asian Winter Games
Asian Games bronze medalists for South Korea
21st-century South Korean people